David Heron may refer to:
David Heron (rugby league), English rugby league footballer
David W. Heron, American librarian
David Heron (statistician), Scottish statistician

See also
David Herron (born 1984), American football linebacker